Charles Boxton (April 24, 1860 in Shasta County, California – August 29, 1927 in San Mateo, California) served as the 27th mayor of San Francisco for seven days, from July 9 to July 16, 1907.

He attended the San Francisco public schools and then entered a dental apprenticeship.  Afterwards he entered the University of California, where he earned a D.D.S. degree, and then entered private practice in San Francisco.

Boxton soon left his dental practice to fight in the Philippine–American War. After returning home, he entered politics and was elected to the San Francisco Board of Supervisors as a Republican in 1899. He also became dean of the Dental Department at San Francisco's College of Physicians and Surgeons.

Mayor of San Francisco 
After the conviction of mayor Eugene Schmitz on bribery charges in July 1907, Boxton was selected by Board of Supervisors to serve as mayor temporarily until a new mayor could be elected at a convention later that same month. 

One day after his election as mayor, Boxton was called as the first witness in the trial of Louis Glass, an executive with the Pacific States Telephone and Telegraph Company, from whom Boxton and 10 other supervisors had admitted taking bribes of $5,000 each. Boxton spent much of his week as a mayor shuttling between court and his official duties, and admitted – in addition to the bribery – to having lied under oath, signing a false affidavit in 1906.

Boxton's tenure as mayor was marked by the additional confusion of former mayor Schmitz refusing to concede he had vacated the office, despite having been convicted and imprisoned for bribery. Insisting he would be exonerated upon appeal and reelected, Schmitz's supporters blockaded the mayor's office, forcing Boxton to relocate his offices.

The convention called to replace Boxton quickly fell apart amid conflicts between business and labor interests. Subsequently, a trio of prosecutors involved in the Schmitz bribery case – including District Attorney William H. Langdon – selected the next mayor, Edward Robeson Taylor, a respected lawyer and physician then serving as dean of the Hastings College of Law. Boxton subsequently resigned as mayor on July 16, allowing the Board of Supervisors to elect Taylor before resigning en masse themselves, thus allowing Taylor to appoint new supervisors.

Later life 
A month after his resignation as mayor in 1907, Boxton was removed as Dean of Dental Department of the College of Physicians and Surgeons. Boxton would later return to the school's board of trustees in 1913 and was reappointed Dean in 1915. The College of Physicians and Surgeons would later be absorbed by the University of the Pacific in 1962, and is today known as the Arthur A. Dugoni School of Dentistry.

Boxton died August 29, 1927 in Redwood City.

Notes

Further reading 

Walton Bean: Boss Ruef's San Francisco: The Story of the Union Labor Party, Big Business, and the Graft Prosecution (Cambridge University Press, London, 1952; republished Greenwood Press, 1981)
Hanson, Gladys: San Francisco Almanac (Chronicle Books, San Francisco, 1995)

External links
Bio from Family Finder
The Political Graveyard

1860 births
1927 deaths
Mayors of San Francisco
American dentists
American dentistry academics